Nathan "Nate the Snake" Bowman (March 19, 1943 – December 11, 1984) was an American basketball player born in Fort Worth, Texas.

A 6'10" center from Wichita State University, Bowman played five seasons (1966–1971) in the National Basketball Association and one season (1971–1972) in the American Basketball Association as a member of the Chicago Bulls, New York Knicks, Buffalo Braves, and Pittsburgh Condors.  He won an NBA Championship as a reserve for the Knicks in 1970.  In his NBA/ABA career, Bowman tallied 745 total points and 878 total rebounds.  He was a good rebounder, but a poor shooter who had a problem with committing personal fouls, thus earning the nickname "Nate the Snake."  In his NBA/ABA career, he committed more personal fouls than he scored field goals.

Bowman was one of several players involved in a November 20, 1968 brawl between the Knicks and Atlanta Hawks at Atlanta's Alexander Memorial Coliseum.  The fight eventually spilled into the stands, where fans grabbed Bowman so that Atlanta's Bill Bridges could land a punch.  None of the participants were fined more than $25.

Bowman was a swinger and attended swing parties at actor Ted Ross's house.

Bowman died of cardiac arrest on December 11, 1984 in New York City. He had finished an audition for a Miller Brewing Company television commercial when he began to complain about chest pains. Bowman arrived at Roosevelt-St. Luke's Hospital with no vital signs and died in the emergency room.

Notes

External links

1943 births
1984 deaths
American men's basketball players
Basketball players from Texas
Buffalo Braves players
Centers (basketball)
Chicago Bulls expansion draft picks
Chicago Bulls players
Cincinnati Royals draft picks
New York Knicks players
Pittsburgh Condors players
Seattle SuperSonics expansion draft picks
Sportspeople from Fort Worth, Texas
Wichita State Shockers men's basketball players